Borobudur Writers and Cultural Festival (BWCF) is an annual meet for fiction and nonfiction writers, content creators, culture activist dan and inter religion with theme to stimulate the participants to realize the uniqueness and richness of various literary, artistic and religious thoughts in the archipelago. The opening of this international scale event was held in 2012 and took place in Yogyakarta, and Borobudur Magelang for the other event. BWCF Participants consists of writers, writers, musicians, dancers, artists, reporters, historians, sociologists, archaeologists, philologists, anthropologists, scientists, humanists and theologians. For two full days, participants were invited to discuss, attend symposiums, attend workshop classes, attend book launches, read temple relief tours, yoga and meditation classes in the courtyard of the Borobudur Temple, watching film screenings, and watching art performances at Aksobya Square.  At the end of the event, BWCF handed over Sang Hyang Kamahayanikan Award to leaders, individuals or groups, who were seen as having a major contribution in the field of arts - culture and humanities in the community.

Important figures

Founder 
 Seno Joko Suyono
 Imam Muhtarom
 Mudji Sutrisno, S.J
 Yoke Darmawan

Advisors 
 Prof. Dr. Toeti Heraty
 Prof. Dr. Oman Fathurahman
 Dr. Hudaya Kandahjaya
 Dr. Agus Widiatmoko

Permanent curator and BWCF manager 
 Mudji Sutrisno SJ
 Seno Joko Suyono
 Imam Muhtahrom
 Yessy Apriati

Organizer 
 Samana Foundation, 2012-2016
 BWCF Society, 2017-now

Theme

Sang Hyang Kamahayanikan Award 
BWCF awarded Sang Hyang Kamahayanikan Award to:

See also 
 Borobudur

Notes

References

External links 
 BWCF Official site

Arts festivals in Indonesia